Pipelining may refer to:

 Pipeline (computing), aka a data pipeline, a set of data processing elements connected in series
 HTTP pipelining, a technique in which multiple HTTP requests are sent on a single TCP connection
 Instruction pipelining, a technique for implementing instruction-level parallelism within a single processor
 Pipelining (DSP implementation), a transformation for optimizing digital circuit
 Pipeline transport, long-distance transportation of a liquid or gas through a system of pipes

See also 
 Pipeline (disambiguation)